Bang Khun Thian  is a khwaeng (sub-district) of Chom Thong district, Bangkok.

History
Bang Khun Thian is a name after a Khlong Bang Khun Thian, a khlong (canal) flows through the area.

The name "Bang Khun Thian" is not clear where it came from. Possibly distorted from the word Bang Khun Thiam or Bang Khun Kwian, because it was the resting place of the kwian (wagon) of a traveler or caravan. It is also proposed that the name comes from the name of a nobleman Khun Thian (ขุนเทียน), who played a role in overseeing the area and vicinity.

In the past, Bang Khun Thian had a wide area extending to the Bangkok Bay (upper Gulf of Thailand) in the present Bang Khun Thian area. But from the new zoning of Bangkok Metropolitan Administration (BMA) in the year 1989, Chom Thong area has become a full district and Bang Khun Thian became part of this newly established district.

Wat Sai floating market used to be in the area of Wat Sai rim Klong Dan or Khlong Sanam Chai used to be a very popular and famous floating market in the 1960s, when it was promoted as a tourist destination by Field Marshal Sarit Thanarat government, but has now closed completely.

Geography
Bang Khun Thian is regarded as the northwest part of the district, with a total area of 5.789 km2 (2.235 mi2). 

The area is bounded by other sub-districts (from north clockwise): Bang Wa in Phasi Charoen District, Bang Kho in its district (Khlong Bang Prathun, Khlong Ta Cham, Khlong Rang Bua, Khlong Suan Luang Tai, Khlong Bang Wa are the borderlines), Chom Thong in its district (Khlong Sanam Chai is a borderline), Chom Thong in its district, Samae Dam in Bang Khun Thian District (Khlong Sanam Chai and Khlong Wat Sing are the borderlines), Khlong Bang Phran in Bang Bon District, Bang Wa in Phasi Charoen District (Khlong Wat Sing and Khlong Bang Ranae are the borderlines).

Population
In 2018 it had a population of 36,479 people.

Transportation
Wutthakat and Ekkachai Roads is a main street of the sub-district.

Bang Khun Thian can also be reached by train via the Maeklong Railway that passes through the area.

While the canals that cross through the area can still serve as a thoroughfare as in the past.

References

Chom Thong district, Bangkok
Subdistricts of Bangkok